Kamence or Kamenče may refer to:

 Kamence, Brežice, small village in the Brežice Municipality in eastern Slovenia
 Kamence, Rogaška Slatina, a settlement in the Rogaška Slatina Municipality in eastern Slovenia
 Gorenje Kamence, settlement to the north of the town of Novo Mesto in southeastern Slovenia
 Kamenče, small settlement in the Braslovče municipality in northern Slovenia